Chima Akas Uche (born 3 May 1994) is a Nigerian international footballer who plays as a center back for Belenenses in Portugal. He has also represented the Nigeria national team.

Club career
After being called up to the full Nigeria international squad, Akas was subject to bids from both Enyimba and Akwa United. After supposedly being offered more money by the latter, he was reported to have signed a contract, and was officially unveiled by the club. The player himself even posted a photo of himself wearing The Promise Keepers jersey on Twitter. However, the transfer was eventually cancelled, and Akas joined Enyimba in March 2016. He was named captain of the NPFL All-Stars in July 2016, and featured in games against Málaga and Valencia.

On 5 December 2022, Akas agreed to join original Belenenses in Liga 3 in January 2023 after playing for the off-shoot club Belenenses SAD for the previous three seasons.

International career
Akas made his senior international debut in a 1–0 friendly defeat by the Ivory Coast in January 2015. He captained his side for qualification for the 2016 African Nations Championship and maintained this status for the full tournament itself.

International statistics

References

External links
 
 Profile at CAF
 Profile at Quintessence Sports Management Ltd

1994 births
Living people
Nigerian footballers
Nigeria international footballers
Association football defenders
Shooting Stars S.C. players
Sharks F.C. players
Kalmar FF players
Enyimba F.C. players
Belenenses SAD players
C.F. Os Belenenses players
Nigeria Professional Football League players
Allsvenskan players
Primeira Liga players
Liga Portugal 2 players
Sportspeople from Ibadan
Nigerian expatriate footballers
Expatriate footballers in Sweden
Expatriate footballers in Portugal
Nigeria A' international footballers
2016 African Nations Championship players
Nigerian expatriate sportspeople in Sweden
Nigerian expatriate sportspeople in Portugal